The 2000 Navy Midshipmen football team represented the United States Naval Academy (USNA) as an independent during the 2000 NCAA Division I-A football season. The team was led by sixth-year head coach Charlie Weatherbie.

Schedule

Roster

Game summaries

Army

The first Army–Navy game in Baltimore since 1944.

References

Navy
Navy Midshipmen football seasons
Navy Midshipmen football